Oxford Street is a street in London, England.

Oxford Street may also refer to:

Oxford Street, Sydney, Australia
Oxford Street, Swansea, Wales
Oxford Street, Manchester, England - also known as Oxford Road
Oxford Street, London, Ontario
Oxford Street, Singapore, a road in Seletar